Ponte Giacomo Matteotti (or briefly Ponte Matteotti), formerly Ponte del Littorio, is a bridge that links Lungotevere Arnaldo da Brescia to Piazza delle Cinque Giornate in Rome (Italy), in the Rione Prati and in the Flaminio and Della Vittoria quarters.

Description 
The bridge, designed by Augusto Antonelli with the name Ponte delle Milizie, was begun in 1924 and completed five years after; it was inaugurated on April 21, 1929 as Ponte del Littorio.

After World War II it was dedicated to the socialist politician Giacomo Matteotti, who was kidnapped nearby.

Notes

Bibliography 

Bridges completed in 1929
Matteotti
Rome R. XXII Prati
Rome Q. I Flaminio
Rome Q. XV Della Vittoria